The Amerind Foundation is a museum and research facility dedicated to the preservation and interpretation of Native American cultures and their histories. Its facilities are located near the village of Dragoon in Cochise County, Arizona, about 65 miles east of Tucson in Texas Canyon.

William Shirley Fulton (1880–1964), an archaeologist, established the Amerind Foundation in 1937.

The Amerind Foundation's building was designed by Tucson architect Merritt Starkweather and contains one of the finest collections of archaeological and ethnological artifacts in the country as well as a sizable research library.

According to the Foundation's literature, "Amerind" is a contraction of the words "American" and "Indian".

Museum exhibits
The museum's permanent exhibits include archaeological artifacts from the Amerind property by founder William Shirley Fulton and later by director Charles C. Di Peso, as well as items found at Di Peso at Casas Grandes, Chihuahua, Mexico and other excavations.  The objects include weapons, tools, baskets, sandals, cordage of human hair, and cloth.

There are ethnographic items from different indigenous peoples ranging from Alaska to South America. Items on display include jewelry, baskets, weapons, cradle boards, religious artifacts, figurative items, ceramics and pottery, and art.

Art Gallery
The Fulton-Hayden Memorial Art Gallery features paintings by 20th century Anglo and Native American artists.

Amerind Foundation published works 
 Archaeological Notes on Texas Canyon, Arizona, by William Shirley Fulton.  Museum of the American Indian, Heye Foundation, Vols. 1–3.  1934–1938.  New York.  (out of print)
 An Archaeological Site Near Gleeson, Arizona, by William Shirley Fulton and Carr Tuthill. Amerind Foundation Publication No. 1.  1940.  (out of print)
 A Ceremonial Cave in the Winchester Mountains, Arizona, by William Shirley Fulton. Amerind Foundation Publication No. 2. 1941. (out of print)
 Painted Cave in Northeastern Arizona, by Emil W. Haury. Amerind Foundation Publication No. 3. 1945.  (out of print)
 The Tres Alamos Site on the San Pedro River, Southeastern Arizona, by Carr Tuthill. Amerind Foundation Publication No. 4. 1947.  (out of print)
 The Babocomari Village Site on the Babocomari River, Southeastern Arizona, by Charles C. Di Peso. Amerind Foundation Publication No. 5. 1951.  (out of print)
 The Sobaipuri Indians of the Upper San Pedro Valley, Southeastern Arizona, by Charles C. Di Peso. Amerind Foundation Publication No. 6. 1953.  (out of print)
 The Upper Pima of San Cayetano del Tumacacori, by Charles C. Di Peso. Amerind Foundation Publication No. 7. 1956.  (out of print)
 The Reeve Ruin of Southeastern Arizona, by Charles C. Di Peso. Amerind Foundation Publication No. 8. 1958.  (out of print)
 Casas Grandes:  A Fallen Trading Center of the Gran Chichimeca, by Charles C. Di Peso, John B. Rinaldo, and Gloria J. Fenner. Amerind Foundation Publication No. 9. Vols. 1–8.  1974.  (out of print)  
 Exploring the Hohokam:  Prehistoric Desert Peoples of the American Southwest, edited by George J. Gumerman. University of New Mexico Press. 1991.  (out of print)  
 Culture and Contact:  Charles C. Di Peso's Gran Chichimeca, edited by Anne I. Woosley and John C. Ravesloot. University of New Mexico Press. 1993.  (out of print)  
 Mimbres Mogollon Archaeology, by Anne I. Woosley and Allan J. McIntyre. Amerind Foundation Publication No. 10. University of New Mexico Press. 1996.  (out of print) 
 Great Towns and Regional Polities:  Cultural Evolution in the U.S. Southwest and Southeast, edited by Jill E. Neitzel. University of New Mexico Press. 1999.  (out of print) 
 Salado, edited by Jeffrey S. Dean. University of New Mexico Press. 2000.  (out of print) 
 Anthropological Perspectives on Technology, edited by Michael B. Schiffer. University of New Mexico Press.  2001.  
 Embedded Symmetries:   Natural and Cultural, edited by Dorothy K. Washburn. University of New Mexico Press. 2004.  
 Trincheras Sites in Time, Space, and Society, edited by Suzanne K. Fish, Paul R. Fish, and M. Elisa Villalpando. University of Arizona Press. 2007.

See also
 Charles C. Di Peso, Amerind's founding Director
 Category: Native American history of Arizona

References and External links 
 Amerind Foundation
 National Museum of the American Indian, Heye Foundation
 Biography of Charles C. Di Peso, Director of the Amerind Foundation from 1954 to 1982.
 Anne I. Woosley, Director of the Amerind Foundation, 1984–2001, currently Executive Director Arizona Historical Society.
 John Ware, current Director of the Amerind Foundation, 2001–present.

Foundations based in the United States
Research institutes in Arizona
Museums in Cochise County, Arizona
Anthropological research institutes
Native American history of Arizona
Native American museums in Arizona
Art museums and galleries in Arizona
Archaeological museums in Arizona
1937 establishments in the United States
Museums established in 1937